Live in the Lou/Bassassins is a CD/DVD release by American rock band Story of the Year on May 10, 2005. The CD Live in the Lou features one set of audio edited from two concerts the band played in their hometown of St. Louis, Missouri at the Pageant theater in November 2004, while the Bassassins DVD features video footage that matches the audio CD and various home movie clips from the band's years on the road.

CD track listing
"And the Hero Will Drown"
"Divide and Conquer"
"Dive Right In"
"Anthem of Our Dying Day"
"Page Avenue"
"Falling Down" (feat. Matt Shelton)
"Burning Years"
"The Heart of Polka Is Still Beating"
"Sidewalks"
"Swallow the Knife" (Instrumental)
"Until the Day I Die"
"In the Shadows"

DVD contents
Concert footage from St. Louis (matches audio track listing)
"Anthem of Our Dying Day" (music video)
"Sidewalks" (music video)
The Making of "Sidewalks"
"Until the Day I Die" (music video)
"Sidewalks": Making the Video (bonus footage)
AOL Sessions (bonus footage)
"Sidewalks"
"Page Avenue"
"Until the Day I Die"
"Anthem of Our Dying Day"
Bassassins (lifestyle feature)

Sales
American sales: 50,000 (Gold as Longform Video)

References

External links

Live in the Lou/Bassassins at YouTube (streamed copy where licensed)

Story of the Year albums
2005 live albums
Live pop punk albums
2005 video albums
Live video albums
Maverick Records live albums
Maverick Records video albums